The sources used to reconstruct the history of the Indo-Greeks are few and disparate, leading to much uncertainty about the precise state of the Indo-Greek kingdom and its chronology. Sources related to the Indo-Greeks can be classified into various categories: ancient literary sources from both the West and the Indian world, archaeological sources from the general area of present day Pakistan, Kashmir and North Indian states of Punjab, Haryana, Himachal Pradesh, Uttar Pradesh & Bihar, and numismatical sources, which are abundant and well-preserved but often rather cryptic.

Literary sources

Western literary sources
Some narrative history has survived for most of the Hellenistic world,  at least of the kings and the wars; this is lacking for India. The main Greco-Roman source on the Indo-Greeks is Justin, who wrote an anthology drawn from the Roman  historian Pompeius Trogus, who in turn wrote, from Greek sources, at the time of Augustus Caesar. Justin tells the parts of Trogus' history he finds particularly interesting at some length; he connects them by short and simplified summaries of the rest of the material. In the process he has left 85% to 90% of Trogus out; and his summaries are held together by phrases like "meanwhile" (eodem tempore) and "thereafter" (deinde), which he uses very loosely. Where Justin covers periods for which there are other and better sources, he has occasionally made provable mistakes. As Tarn and Develin both point out, Justin is not trying to write history in our sense of the word; he is collecting instructive moral anecdotes. Justin does find the customs and growth of the Parthians, which were covered in Trogus' 41st book, quite interesting, and discusses them at length; in the process, he mentions four of the kings of Bactria and one Greek king of India, getting the names of two of them wrong.

In addition to these dozen sentences,  the geographer Strabo mentions India a few times in the course of his long dispute with Eratosthenes about the shape of Eurasia. Most of these are purely geographical claims, but he does mention that Eratosthenes' sources say that some of the Greek kings conquered further than Alexander; Strabo does not believe them on this,  but modern historians do; nor does he believe that Menander and Demetrius son of Euthydemus conquered more tribes than Alexander  There is half a story about Bactria (only) in one of the books of Polybius which has not come down to us intact.

In the 1st century BCE, the geographer Isidorus of Charax mentions Parthians ruling over Greek populations and cities in Arachosia: "Beyond is Arachosia. And the Parthians call this White India; there are the city of Biyt and the city of Pharsana and the city of Chorochoad and the city of Demetrias; then Alexandropolis, the metropolis of Arachosia; it is Greek, and by it flows the river Arachotus. As far as this place the land is under the rule of the Parthians."

According to Strabo, Greek advances temporarily went as far as the Shunga capital Pataliputra (today Patna) in eastern India: 

The 1st century BCE Greek historian Apollodorus, quoted by Strabo, affirms that the Bactrian Greeks, led by Demetrius I and Menander, conquered India and occupied a larger territory than the Macedonians under Alexander the Great, going beyond the Hypanis towards the Himalayas:

The Roman historian Justin also mentioned the Indo-Greek conquests, describing Demetrius as "King of the Indians" ("Regis Indorum"), and explaining that after vanquishing him Eucratides in turn "put India under his rule" ("Indiam in potestatem redegit") (since the time of the embassies of Megasthenes in the 3rd century BCE "India" was understood as the entire subcontinent, and was cartographed by geographers such as Eratosthenes). Justin also mentions Apollodotus and Menander as kings of the Indians.

Greek and Indian sources tend to indicate that the Greeks campaigned as far as Pataliputra until they were forced to retreat following the coup staged by Eucratides back in Bactria circa 170 BCE, suggesting an occupation period of about eight years. Alternatively, Menander may merely have joined a raid led by Indian Kings down the Ganges (A.K. Narain and Keay 2000), as Indo-Greek territory has only been confirmed from the Kabul Valley to the Punjab.

To the south, the Greeks occupied the areas of the Sindh and Gujarat down to the region of Surat (Greek: Saraostus) near Mumbai (Bombay), including the strategic harbour of Barygaza (Bharuch), as attested by several writers (Strabo 11; Periplus of the Erythraean Sea, Chap. 41/47) and as evidenced by coins dating from the Indo-Greek ruler Apollodotus I:

The 1st century CE Periplus of the Erythraean Sea describes numerous Greek buildings and fortifications in Barigaza, although mistakenly attributing them to Alexander, and testifies to the circulation of Indo-Greek coinage in the region:

From ancient authors (Pliny, Arrian, Ptolemy and Strabo), a list of provinces, satrapies, or simple regional designations, and Greek cities from within the Indo-Greek Kingdom can be discerned (though others have been lost), ranging from the Indus basin to the upper valley of the Ganges.

Indian literary sources
There are  Indian literary sources, ranging from the Milinda Panha, a dialogue between a Buddhist sage Nagasena and King Menander I, which includes some incidental information on Menander's biography and the geography and institutions of his kingdom, down to a sentence about Menander (presumably the same Menander) and his attack on Pataliputra which happens to have survived as a standard example in grammar texts; none is a narrative history. Names in these sources are consistently Indianized, and there is some dispute whether, for example, Dharmamitra represents "Demetrius" or is an Indian prince with that name. There was also a Chinese expedition to Bactria by Chang-k'ien under the Emperor Wu of Han, recorded in the Records of the Grand Historian and Book of the Former Han, additional evidence is in the Book of the Later Han; the identification of places and peoples behind transcriptions into Chinese is difficult, and several alternate interpretations have been proposed.

Various Indian records describe Yavana attacks on Mathura, Panchala, Saketa, and Pataliputra. The term Yavana is thought to be a transliteration of "Ionians" and is known to have designated Hellenistic Greeks (starting with the Edicts of Ashoka, where Ashoka writes about "the Yavana king Antiochus"), but may have sometimes referred to other foreigners as well, especially in later centuries.

Patanjali, a grammarian and commentator on Pāṇini around 150 BCE, describes in the Mahābhāsya, the invasion in two examples using the imperfect tense of Sanskrit, denoting a recent event: 
 "Arunad Yavanah Sāketam" ("The Yavanas (Greeks) were besieging Saketa")
 "Arunad Yavano Madhyamikām" ("The Yavanas were besieging Madhyamika" (the "Middle country")).

The Anushasanaparava of the Mahabharata affirms that the country of Mathura, the heartland of India, was under the joint control of the Yavanas and the Kambojas. The Vayupurana asserts that Mathura was ruled by seven Greek kings over a period of 82 years.

Accounts of battles between the Greeks and the Shunga in Central India are also found in the Mālavikāgnimitram, a play by Kālidāsa which describes an encounter between Greek forces and Vasumitra, the grandson of Pushyamitra, during the latter's reign.

Also the Brahmanical text of the Yuga Purana, which describes Indian historical events in the form of a prophecy, relates the attack of the Indo-Greeks on the capital Pataliputra, a magnificent fortified city with 570 towers and 64 gates according to Megasthenes, and describes the ultimate destruction of the city's walls:

According to the Yuga Purana a situation of complete social disorder follows, in which the Yavanas rule and mingle with the people, and the position of the Brahmins and the Sudras is inverted:

Archaeological sources
There is also significant archaeological evidence, including some  epigraphic evidence, for the Indo-Greek kings, such as the mention of the "Yavana" embassy of king Antialcidas on the Heliodorus pillar in Vidisha, primarily in Indic languages, which has the same problems with names as the Indic literary evidence.

Urban remains
The city of Sirkap, today in northwestern Pakistan near Taxila, was built according to the "Hippodamian" grid-plan characteristic of Greek cities, and was a Hellenistic fortress of considerable proportions, with a 6,000 meter wall on the circumference, of a height of about 10 meters. The houses of the Indo-Greek level are "the best planned of all the six strata, and the rubble masonry of which its walls are built is also the most solid and compact". It is thought that the city was built by Demetrius.

Artifacts

Several Hellenistic artifacts have been found, in particular coins of Indo-Greek kings, stone palettes representing Greek mythological scenes, and small statuettes. Some of them are purely Hellenistic, others indicate an evolution of the Greco-Bactrian styles found at Ai-Khanoum towards more indianized styles.
For example, accessories such as Indian ankle bracelets can be found on some representations of Greek mythological figures such as Artemis.

The excavations of the Greek levels at Sirkap were however very limited and made in peripheral areas, out of respect for the more recent archaeological strata (those of the Indo-Scythian and especially Indo-Parthian levels) and the remaining religious buildings, and due to the difficulty of excavating extensively to a depth of about 6 meters. The results, although interesting, are partial and cannot be considered as exhaustive. Beyond this, no extensive archaeological excavation of an Indo-Greek city has ever really been done.

Quantities of Hellenistic artifacts and ceramics can also be found throughout Northern India. Clay seals depicting Greek deities, and the depiction of an Indo-Greek king thought to be Demetrius, were found at Benares.

Stupas

When the Indo-Greeks settled in the area of Taxila, large Buddhist structures were already present, such as the stupa of Dharmarajika built by Ashoka in the 3rd century BCE. These structures were reinforced in the following centuries, by building rings of smaller stupas and constructions around the original ones. Numerous coins of the Indo-Greek king Zoilos II were found under the foundation of a 1st-century BCE rectangular chapel near the Dharmarajika stupa.

Also, various Buddhist structures, such as the Butkara Stupa in the area of Swat were enlarged and decorated with Hellenistic architectural elements in the 2nd century BCE, especially during the rule of Menander. Stupas were just round mounds when the Indo-Greeks settled in India, possibly with some top decorations, but soon they added various structural and decorative elements, such as reinforcement belts, niches, architectural decorations such as plinthes, toruses and cavettos, plaster painted with decorative scrolls. The niches were probably designed to place statues or friezes, an indication of early Buddhist descriptive art during the time of the Indo-Greeks. Coins of Menander were found within these constructions dating them to around 150 BCE. By the end of Indo-Greek rule and during the Indo-Scythian period (1st century BCE), stupas were highly decorated with colonnaded flights of stairs and Hellenistic scrolls of Acanthus leaves.

Numismatical sources
One of the key pieces of archaeological evidence about the Indo-Greeks is the coins. There are coin finds of several dozen Indo-Greek rulers in India; exactly how many is complicated to determine, because the Greeks did not number their kings, and the eastern Greeks did not date their coins. For example, there are a substantial number of coin finds for a King Demetrius, but authors have postulated one, two, or three Demetrii, and the same coins have been identified by different enquirers as describing Demetrius I, Demetrius II, or Demetrius III. The following deductions have been made from coins, in addition to mere existence:
Kings who left many coins reigned long and prosperously.
Hoards which contain many coins of the same king come from his realm.
Kings who use the same iconography are friendly, and may well be from the same family,
If a king overstrikes another king's coins, this is an important evidence to show that the overstriker reigned after the overstruck. Overstrikes may indicate that the two kings were enemies.
Indo-Greek coins, like other Hellenistic coins, have monograms in addition to their inscriptions. These are generally held to indicate a mint official; therefore, if two kings issue coins with the same monogram, they reigned in the same area, and if not immediately following one another, have no long interval between them.
All of these arguments are arguments of probability, and have exceptions; one of Menander's coins was found in Wales.

See also

Greco-Bactrian Kingdom
Seleucid Empire
Greco-Buddhism
Indo-Scythians
Indo-Parthian Kingdom
Kushan Empire
Roman commerce
Timeline of Indo-Greek Kingdoms

Footnotes

References

reprinted by Oxford, 1962, 1967, 1980; reissued (2003), "revised and supplemented", by B. R. Publishing Corporation, New Delhi.

Second edition, with addenda and corrigenda, (1951). Reissued, with updating preface by Frank Lee Holt (1985), Ares Press, Chicago

External links

News story of the latest archaeological discovery of artefacts dated back to Indo-Greek period
Indo-Greek history and coins
Ancient coinage of the Greco-Bactrian and Indo-Greek kingdoms
Text of Prof. Nicholas Sims-Williams (University of London) mentioning the arrival of the Kushans and the replacement of Greek Language.
Wargame reconstitution of Indo-Greek armies
Files dealing with Indo-Greeks & a genealogy of the Bactrian kings

Sources